Jabal Habashi District is a district of the Taiz Governorate, Yemen. As of 2003, the district had a population of 24,544 inhabitants.

References

 
Districts of Taiz Governorate